Devil on Deck is a 1932 Pre-code talking film directed by Wallace Fox and starring Reed Howes and Molly O'Day. It was produced and distributed by Sono Art-World Wide Pictures, a B-movie studio that turned out occasionally some successful pictures like The Great Gabbo.

Story
As this is a lost film, not even the AFI has any story or plot on it. By the promotional material that survives, it's a typical South Seas story found all over the silent film era just a few years before sound arrived. The cast is made up mostly of silent film veterans.

Cast
Reed Howes as  John Moore
Molly O'Day as Kay Wheeler
Wheeler Oakman as  Shanghai Morgan
June Marlowe as Mary Moore
Kenneth Treseder as Limey
A. S. 'Pop' Byron as Pop Wheeler
Rolfe Sedan as Frenchie
Constantine Romanoff as Swede

Preservation status
This film is presumed lost.

References

External links
  Devil on Deck at IMDb.com
  lobby card

1932 films
Films directed by Wallace Fox
1932 adventure films
Films set on islands
Lost American films
American black-and-white films
American adventure films
Lost adventure films
1932 lost films
1930s American films